The Samsung Galaxy M22 is an Android-based smartphone by Samsung. It is a part of Samsung Galaxy M series. This phone announced on September 14, 2021.

References 

Samsung Galaxy
Mobile phones introduced in 2021
Android (operating system) devices
Samsung mobile phones
Samsung smartphones
Mobile phones with multiple rear cameras